Max Bowden (born 31 December 1994) is an English actor. He is best known for his roles as Justin Fitzgerald in the BBC One school-based drama series Waterloo Road, and his portrayal of Ben Mitchell in the BBC soap opera EastEnders.

Career
In 2014, Bowden joined the cast of Waterloo Road in the role of Justin Fitzgerald. In 2016, he played Kash Ryland in the BBC medical drama Casualty. Then in 2019, Bowden was cast as the sixth actor to portray Ben Mitchell in the BBC soap opera EastEnders.

Filmography

Stage

Awards and nominations

References

External links
 

21st-century English male actors
Living people
English male stage actors
English male soap opera actors
1994 births